Mchafukoge is an administrative ward in the Ilala district of the Dar es Salaam Region of Tanzania. In 2016 the Tanzania National Bureau of Statistics report there were 13,384 people in the ward, from 10,688 in 2012.

References

Ilala District
Wards of Dar es Salaam Region